Kroos is a 2019 documentary film about German professional footballer Toni Kroos. The film was directed by Manfred Oldenburg and produced by Leopold Hoesch.

Synopsis 
The film tells the story of national player Toni Kroos from Greifswalder SC to Real Madrid. The various stages of his career are presented and his sporting career is traced. In addition to the athletic analysis, the film provides insights into the private life of Toni Kroos. The father of three founded the Toni Kroos Foundation in 2015, which is also presented in the film.

In addition to family members of Toni Kroos – among others wife Jessica, brother Felix and his parents Birgit and Roland Kroos – the film mainly features his sporting companions. These include the coaches Pep Guardiola, Jupp Heynckes and Zinédine Zidane, the president of FC Bayern Munich, Uli Hoeneß, the president of Real Madrid, Florentino Pérez, as well as the professional footballers Gareth Bale, Luka Modrić and Sergio Ramos and even singer, entertainer and football fan Robbie Williams. In addition, football experts and journalists such as Marcel Reif and Wolfram Eilenberger comment on the development and special features of Toni Kroos and his playing style.

Production 
The film is a production of Broadview Pictures, funded by the Film- und Medienstiftung NRW, the FilmFernsehFonds Bayern and the Deutscher Filmförderfonds.

Reception 
Manfred Riepe praises the director in the magazine epd Film, because Oldenburg says in this entertaining film a little more than that the ball is round and the game lasts 90 minutes: "This film conveys itself even to those who normally don't care much about football".

On Spiegel Online, Peter Ahrens criticizes that one learns little about the main character, even though Kroos is always in the picture. "What he thinks about the world, about football, about the business, about the things in life, cannot be understood even after an hour and a half on the cinema screen (...) The deeper the film delves into the subject, the less important Toni Kroos seems to be".

References

External links 
 
 
 „Kroos – Das Hirn des Fußballs“, Zeit-Online, Christian Spiller
 „In Deutschland frisst der Fußball alles auf“, Toni Kroos in an interview with Harald Hordych, Süddeutsche Zeitung
 „Kroos? Krööser? KROOSARTIG!“, BILD, Norbert Körzdörfer
 „Der stille Anführer“, RP-Online, Phillip Oldenburg
 „Unser Weltmeister im Kino: Die fantastische Reise des Toni Kroos“, Ostsee-Zeitung, Sönke Fröbe
 „Köln ist meine auserwählte Heimat in Deutschland“, Toni Kroos in an interview with Carsten Fiedler, Kölner Stadt-Anzeiger

2019 documentary films
2019 films
2010s German-language films
2010s French-language films
2010s Spanish-language films
2010s English-language films